Petro Muha (fl. 1490) was a Ukrainian rebel, military leader and Ukrainian national hero, best known as the leader of the eponymous Mukha Rebellion against Polish magnates and noblemen in Galicia started with Moldavian support. This uprising was one of the largest of the 15th and 16th century in the area, together with Severyn Nalyvaiko's.

Biography
Between 1490 and 1492 he led an army of 10,000 people, both Ukrainians and Moldavians, as well as a number of other people and Orthodox petty nobles, in an attempt to overthrow the Polish in Galicia. Mukha had support from Stephen the Great, the Moldavian voivode of the time. The revolt erupted in Pokuttia, quickly spreading to other parts of Galicia. The rebellious army proceeded through the territory, taking the cities of Halych, Sniatyn, and Kolomyia.

Mukha and his army were blocked by a combined force of Polish Royal army, a levée en masse summoned by Galician noblemen, and Prussian mercenaries. Many of the rebellious army's warriors died in the Battle of Rohatyn, near Rohatyn. Mukha and the survivors fled back to Moldavia. They returned to Galicia in 1492, in an attempt to stir up another rebellion.

Mukha was captured near Kolomyia, and died in the dungeons of a prison in Kraków.

In popular culture
Volodymyr Hrabovetsky wrote a book about Mukha's rebellion, which was published in Kyiv in 1979.

References

Ukrainian rebels
Ukrainian military leaders
15th-century military personnel